Kristian Bezuidenhout is an Australian pianist, who specializes in performances on early keyboard instruments.

He was born in South Africa in 1979 and grew up in King William's Town in Eastern South Africa. In 1988 his family decided to leave South Africa and move to Australia. There Bezuidenhout began his studies and completed them later at the Eastman School of Music. He studied fortepiano with Malcolm Bilson and harpsichord with Arthur Haas. At the age 21 he gained international recognition after winning the first prize in the Bruges Fortepiano Competition.

As a guest pianist Bezuidenhout collaborated with the Freiburg Baroque Orchestra, Concerto Köln, the Collegium Vocale Gent and Les Arts Florissants. He performed with conductors John Eliot Gardiner, Philippe Herreweghe, Trevor Pinnock, Frans Brüggen, and Giovanni Antonini. As a lied pianist, Bezuidenhout recorded songs by Haydn, Mozart, Beethoven and Schumann.

Kristian Bezuidenhout currently lives in London.

Recordings 
 Kristian Bezuidenhout, Freiburger Barockorchester, Pablo Heras-Casado. Felix Mendelssohn. Piano Concerto No.2 & Symphony No.1. Played on Erard 1837 fortepiano. Label: Harmonia Mundi
 Daniel Hope (violin), Kristian Bezuidenhout (harpsichord and organ), Anne Sofie von Otter (mezzo-soprano), Chamber Orchestra of Europe. Vivaldi. Label: Deutsche Grammophon
 Kristian Bezuidenhout with Jan Kobow. Franz Schubert. Die schöne Mullerin. Played on a replica of original Graf piano made by Paul McNulty. Label: Atma
 Kristian Bezuidenhout. Wolfgang Amadeus Mozart. Keyboard Music Vol.2. Played on a replica of the original Walter (Paul McNulty). Label: Harmonia Mundi
 Kristian Bezuidenhout. Ludwig van Beethoven. Piano Concertos Nos. 2&5. Played on a replica of a Graf 1824 made by R.Regier. Label: Harmonia Mundi.
 Kristian Bezuidenhout, Isabelle Faust. Johann Sebastian Bach. Sonatas for Violin & Harpsichord. Label: Harmonia Mundi

References

External links 
 Official website: kristianbezuidenhout.com

Australian classical pianists
Male classical pianists
Australian fortepianists
1979 births
Living people
21st-century Australian musicians
21st-century classical pianists
21st-century male musicians